Aruba is scheduled to compete at the 2023 Pan American Games in Santiago, Chile from October 20 to November 5, 2023. This will be Aruba's 10th appearance at the Pan American Games, having competed at every edition of the Games since 1987.

Competitors
The following is the list of number of competitors (per gender) participating at the games per sport/discipline.

Bowling

Aruba qualified a team of two women through the 2022 South American Games held in Asuncion, Paraguay.

Cycling

BMX
Aruba qualified a female cyclist in BMX race through the UCI World Rankings.

Racing

Sailing

Aruba has qualified 1 boat for a total of 1 sailor.

Men

References

Aruba at the Pan American Games